The 1972 LFF Lyga was the 51st season of the LFF Lyga football competition in Lithuania.  It was contested by 15 teams, and Nevezis Kedainiai won the championship.

League standings

References
RSSSF

LFF Lyga seasons
1972 in Lithuania
LFF